Harry Hood may refer to:
Harry Hood (footballer) (1944–2019), Scottish footballer
"Harry Hood" (song), Phish live song
Harry Hood (Canadian football) (1926–1954), Canadian football player

See also
Harold Hood (1916–2005)
Hood (surname)

Hood, Harry